Van Duyne may refer to:

 Beth Van Duyne (born 1970), American politician
 Bob Van Duyne (born 1952), American American football player
 Carl Van Duyne (1946–83), American sailor
 LeRoy Van Duyne (1923–2003), American politician

See also
 Van Duyne House (disambiguation)

Surnames of Dutch origin